Pich Sophea (Khmer: ពេជ្រ សោភា), (born June 9, 1985) is a Cambodian singer and songwriter.  First in the song (Better Day) with rapper "DJ-Sdey" released by Hang Meas Production (2004) This song made her gain recognition from She is also an actress, a goodwill ambassador for a well-known brand, and is known as a judge and a member of the audit committee, which evaluates the reality of the sound presented during the Blind audition, The Voice Cambodia.

Early life 
Pich Sophea was born on June 9, 1985, in Sangkat Boeung Salang, Khan Toul Kork, Phnom Penh.  She has a father named Pich Savann and a mother named Sour Sopheap and four siblings. Her parents are businessmen, so as a child, "Sophea" had to help her parents sell food to support her education.  She had to sing for a restaurant in Phnom Penh until she graduated with a high school diploma (grade 12). During 2003, she switched to singing for an entertainment center called "Spark Entertainment Center". Just about a year ago, she was approached to sing for a giant production in Cambodia known as "Hang Meas Production" during the 2004 release of her first album.  She is titled (Better Day), which is her first song to step into the art world.

Music career 
From 2005 to 2010, Pich Sophea's popularity gradually increased and she became popular in Cambodia, making her one of the top singers in Cambodia. Many of Sophea's most popular songs, released during 2005, U Better Not Come Home, Dream about you, became the Hits Album of the Year in Cambodia, becoming the most-listened-to song on Cambodian radio stations. She gained a lot of popularity and support during that time when the song (U Better Not Come Home) was included in Top1 Music Radio FM.97 (2005) by Apsara Radio FM 97.  Invite her to perform in Australia as well.

From 2006 to 2008, Sophea released a series of songs and also appeared in the biggest concert in Cambodia, the Best of The Best concert 2006-2007-2008, this big concert was attended by Tens of thousands of spectators lined the grounds of the Phnom Penh Olympic Stadium.  During 2009, Sophea was invited by her fans to perform in France, and she received more support than expected until now.  In 2010, Sophea was invited by Channel 5 (Cambodia TV5) to perform at the Asean Top10 Music Concert.

Pich Sophea Music Tour (2011–2013) 
During 2011–2013, Pich Sophea was invited by her fans to perform a two-month tour of the United States through the Cambodian Arts Association there, which earned her a lot of support. Cambodians living in the United States as well. During 2012, Pich Sophea participated in an encouraging presentation on education in Sols 24/7 GDI Cambodia Free Education For All, an organization to support education and education in Cambodia as a charity, For the society as well. During 2013, Sophea was invited to perform on her second US tour in Stockton, California, which was her success in building a reputation for growing popularity among Cambodians. Americans who love and support her as well as help raise Cambodian artists.

The Voice Coach (2014–2016) 
Sophea is known as the Judge Coach and a member of the Audit Committee, which evaluates the reality of the soundtrack shown during the Blind audition of The Voice Cambodia on Hang Meas-HDTV Season 1. And the second season since its inception in 2014, when her first team, Soy Rattanak, qualified for The Final (Runner Up) Episode 16 of Week 6 and the second season in 2016 The second group, Miss (San Srey Lai / Death), made it to The Final (Runner Up) Episode 16 of Week 6.  After The Voice Cambodia, Sophea also left Cambodia for France for a medical check-up.

Pich Sophea Pop Music (2015–2016) 
During 2015–2016, Sophea released many popular songs known as (Pop Music) teaming up with rapper G-Devith, who is a Sound Mixed Editing musician. Also, the two dropped the song "Coffee 1500" is an original song that was popular during that time, which attracted a large number of fans from young people, this song Coffee 1500 was Sophea to compete in MAMF Migrant's Arirang Multicultural Festival 2015 in South Korea, and this song also ranked third, representing the culture, art, music from Cambodia.

In 2016, Sophea and David released a joint album during the Khmer New Year, "រាំញីកែងជើង"
/ "Heel Dance", which is the most popular hit album in Cambodia, which is the most popular on social media and External society, and was announced by the Prime Minister of Cambodia, Mr. Hun Sen, the most popular song of the year (Music of the years) and give bonuses to singers. Both of them received 162 million riels, equivalent to about 40,000 US dollars.

Pich Sophea Brand Ambassador 
During 2016, Guangdong-based mobile telecommunications company Oppo officially selected singer Pich Sophea to be the brand ambassador of Oppo Cambodia. Mr. Soeur Rithya, Marketing Manager of OPPO Cambodia, said that OPPO has more than 2 present. Years ago in Cambodia and today the company chose the top singer Pich Sophea to represent its products because he Assume that the promotion of Dara's products that are gaining popularity in Cambodia will increase the number of supporters, On Oppo Cambodia as well.

Hits Songs (2017–2019) 
In 2017–2018, even though she did not have a singing partner with G-Devith, Sophea's popularity still supported her, and she released a series of popular songs that received more than over 20 million views on YouTube, including the song: What's Your Names, Huy Huy, Frog wearing a hat, which has more than 20 million views on YouTube. Make her songs popular at that time.

Cambodia Top 50 Billboard (2019) 
In 2019, Sophea released a song with Mr. Khemarak Sereymun, released by Reaksmey Hang Meas Production, entitled "My wife is not good" which put the song rights to the music player (Pleng) Developed by Smart Mobile, which selects only the most popular songs from the listeners to be among the top 50 song choices that can stand at the top of the Weekly of Cambodia Top 50. Billboard's Sophea Song Top 4 in the Top 50 Songs in Cambodia.

Achievement

Discography

TV shows 
 Coach for The Voice Cambodia (season 1) 2014 with Nop Bayyareth, Aok Sokunkanha,and Chhorn Sovannareach.
 Coach for The Voice Cambodia (season 2) 2016 with Nop Bayyareth, Aok Sokunkanha,and Chhorn Sovannareach.

References 

1985 births
Living people
21st-century Cambodian women singers